This is a list of episodes for the television series McCloud.

Series overview

Episodes
Run time is the length in minutes of the intended time slot (including commercials).

Pilot (1970)

Season 1 (1970)

Season 1 Re-edited for Syndication (1976-77)

The 6 original 60-minute episodes of season 1 were combined into 3 new episodes for syndication. Some material was cut and some linking voice-overs were added.  Directors and Writers are shown as they appear in the on-screen credits.  "Matthew Howard" is reportedly a pseudonym for Douglas Heyes, who wrote the original episode 1.

Season 2 (1971–72)

Season 3 (1972–73)

Season 4 (1973–74)

Season 5 (1974–75)

Season 6 (1975–76)

Season 7 (1976–77)

Special (1989)

References

External links
 
 

Lists of American crime drama television series episodes